A trephine (from Greek trypanon, meaning an instrument for boring) is a surgical instrument with a cylindrical blade. It can be of one of several dimensions and designs depending on what it is meant to be used for. They may be specially designed for obtaining a cylindrically shaped core of bone that can be used for tests and bone studies, cutting holes in bones (e.g., the skull) or for cutting out a round piece of the cornea for eye surgery.

A cylindrically shaped core of bone (or bone biopsy) obtained with a bone marrow trephine is usually examined in the histopathology department of a hospital under a microscope.  It shows the pattern and cellularity of the bone marrow as it lay in the bone and is a useful diagnostic tool in certain circumstances such as bone marrow cancer and leukemia.

See also
Trepan
Trepanning    
Trepanation in Mesoamerica
Instruments used in general surgery

References

External links
 

Surgical instruments
Hole making